Sydney Fisher may refer to:

Sydney Arthur Fisher (1850–1921), Canadian politician
Sydney George Fisher (1856–1927), American lawyer and historian
Sydney Nettleton Fisher (1906–1987), American historian